The Newtownards Chronicle, (formally The Newtownards Chronicle & Co. Down Observer) established in 1873, is a local weekly newspaper based in Newtownards, Northern Ireland, serving the communities of Ards, Ards peninsula and the Greater Ards area. It is published on Thursdays.

References

External links
 

Newspapers published in Northern Ireland
Newtownards
Mass media in County Down